The 2017 Netball Superleague Grand Final featured Wasps and Loughborough Lightning. Wasps won the Netball Superleague title in their debut season, beating Lightning 55–51 in the grand final. Wasps led by one goal at the start of the final quarter, having dominated Lightning in the mid-court. Wasps centre, Bongiwe Msomi, was subsequently named player of the match.
Wasps attacking combination of Rachel Dunn and Natalie Haythornthwaite proved too strong for Lightning.

Route to the Final

Match summary

Teams

References

2017 Netball Superleague season
2017
Wasps Netball matches
Loughborough Lightning netball matches
Netball Superleague